Bhai Rupa is a town in the sub-division Rampura Phul in the Bathinda district of the Punjab. It celebrates the name of a prominent Khokhar (some people say Rajput but descendants claim to be Ramgarhia and some claim to be jatt sikh)Sikh, BhaiRupa (Roop Chand, 1614–1709), the son of Bhai Sadhu, who laid the foundation of the village in 1631, at the instance of Guru Hargobind. Next to BhaiRupa's house, a gurdwara (Sikh community center) was built in Guru Hargobind's honour. The present Gurdwara Sahib Patshahi Chhevin, a two-storey domed building, marks that site inside the village. Guru ka Langar is across a narrow lane. In the same direction is the pavilion, raised recently to accommodate larger divans.

The Gurdwara, though affiliated to the Gurdwara Local Committee, BhaiRupa, is managed by the descendants of BhaiRupa. Close to the Gurdwara, in a private house belonging to one of the descendants of Bhai Rupa, there is preserved an old rath or chariot. It is said to have been brought from Dera Ram Rai at Dehra Dun by Bhai Gian Chand, a grandson of Bhai Roop Chand Ji. According to local tradition, it once belonged to Guru Arjan and was used by his successors, Guru Hargobind and Guru Har Rai.

The title of "Bhai"

The guru in recognition of devotion, honoured Roop Chand with the title of "bhai" (own brother) and put him in charge of the spiritual welfare of the new region of Malwa and the country south of Sutlej. With his own hands Guru Ji made Bhai Roop Chand the masand of the area and put on his forehead the tilaka, (saffron mark of leadership) and gave a karchha, a long spoon, asking him to run langar to feed the poor and the needy. This karchha is a symbol of veneration for the family. The guru also remarked that even fresh cut wood would burn like dry wood in the langar fire. This can be seen even now at Dyalpura Bhai village at any time.

Education 
There are five government and several private schools in this village 
Government Senior Secondary School Bhai Rupa,
Government Girls Senior Secondary School Bhai Rupa
Government Girls Elementary School Bhai Rupa
Government Boys Elementary School Bhai Rupa
Government Elementary School (Branch) Bhai Rupa.
Bhai Roop Chand Senior Secondary School
  Shaheed Smarak Sen.Sec. School & college
Sunrise Public Senior Secondary School
Summer Hill Public Senior Secondary School
Guru Kul International Public School
Hargobind Public School

Restaurants and Marriage Palaces
Golden marriage palace
Maharaja palace
Fresh fast food and restaurant
Punjabi grill food point and restaurant
Saini sweets corner and many more...

Facilities

Bus stands
Main bus stand
Harpal Khokher bus stand
Jalal bus stand
Sailbrah bus stand
Gumti bus stand
Gate Wala bus stand

Banks 
Punjab & Sind Bank Gumti Road Bhai Rupa
The Bathinda Co-op Central Bank 
State Bank Of India

Main Bazar
grain market
Vegetable markets
Main bus stand 
Near GE School
Post Office Main Bazar

Hospitals
Primary Health Centre Bhai Rupa
Veterinary Hospital Main Bazar (Dr. Sarbjit Singh)
Many private hospitals

Other facilities
Bhai Roop Chand taxi service
Sh. Harpal Singh khokhar library
Bhai Ghnya Ji library
Webdesign Service, for new websites, Contact Here
BSNL Brodband and all 2G services
Jio 4G,Airtel 4G & 3G,Idea 4G & 3G, BSNL 3G, TATA docomo 3G 
ਹਰਗੋਬਿਂਦ ਸਾਹਿਬ ਫਿਲੋਰ ਮਿਲ ਛੰਨਾਂ ਰੋਡ ਕੋਠੇ ਬਾਬਾ ਸੁੱਖਾ ਨੰਦ

Sewa kendra
Bhai Rupa 
Code PB-046-00244-U017 Type II, Address::Govt. Elementary School Bhai Rupa, Teh. Rampura Phul, Pin 151106

Connectivity of Bhai Rupa

See also 
 Rampura Phul
 Bathinda

References

External links
 Google satellite map of Bhai Rupa

Cities and towns in Bathinda district